VV 166, sometimes also called the NGC 70 galaxy group or Arp 113, is a cluster of galaxies in Andromeda. The main group was discovered in 1784 by William Herschel, who listed the galaxies as a single object. Later, in the 1880s, John Louis Emil Dreyer managed to discern some of the galaxies in this region and cataloged them. The prominent elliptical galaxy in the region, NGC 68, is probably not a member of the group.

Superimposed on the group is a smaller cluster around 220 mly away, which includes AGC 102760, UGC 152, and UGC 166.

Members

References

Galaxy clusters
Andromeda (constellation)